Silicon Alley is an area of high tech companies centered around southern Manhattan's Flatiron district in New York City. The term was coined in the 1990s during the dot-com boom, alluding to California's Silicon Valley tech center. The term has grown somewhat obsolete since 2003 as New York tech companies spread outside of Manhattan. 

, New York City hosted 300,000 employees in the tech sector. In 2015, New York companies drew over US$7.3 billion in venture capital. High technology startup companies and employment are growing in New York City and across the metropolitan region, bolstered by the city's emergence as a global node of creativity and entrepreneurship, social tolerance, and environmental sustainability, as well as New York's position as the leading Internet hub and telecommunications center in North America, including its vicinity to several transatlantic fiber optic trunk lines, the city's intellectual capital, and its extensive outdoor wireless connectivity.

Origin 

The term Silicon Alley was derived from the long-established Silicon Valley in California. It was originally centered in the Flatiron District, in the vicinity of the Flatiron Building at Fifth Avenue near Broadway and 23rd Street, straddling Midtown and Lower Manhattan. Silicon Alley initially also used to extend to Dumbo, a neighborhood in Brooklyn. Columbia University and NYU's leaderships were especially important in the alley's early development. 

The term Silicon Alley may have originated in 1995 by a New York staffing recruiter, Jason Denmark, who was supporting clients in the newly dubbed technical hub in downtown Manhattan; in an effort to attract candidates who, at that time, were focusing on positions in Silicon Valley, he posted in public usenet postings of Object Technology Developers, job ads with the Silicon Alley label. "Subject: NYC - silicon ALLEY" shows up in an internet post by Jason Denmark on February 16, 1995; another Jason Denmark post on June 16, 1995, is "Subject: SILICON 'ALLEY' POSITIONS."

The first publication to cover Silicon Alley was @NY, an online newsletter founded in the summer of 1995 by Tom Watson and Jason Chervokas. The first magazine to focus on venture capital opportunities in Silicon Alley, AlleyCat News co-founded by Anna Copeland Wheatley and Janet Stites, was launched in the fall of 1996. Courtney Pulitzer branched off from her @The Scene column with @NY and created Courtney Pulitzer's Cyber Scene and her popular networking events Cocktails with Courtney. First Tuesday, co-founded by Vincent Grimaldi de Puget and John Grossbart, became the largest gathering of Silicon Alley, welcoming 500 to 1000 venture capitalists and entrepreneurs every month. It was an initiative of law firm Sonnenschein and the Kellogg School of Management, as well as other corporate founders, including Accenture (then Andersen Consulting), AlleyCat News and Merrill Lynch. Silicon Alley Reporter started publishing in October 1996. It was founded by Jason Calacanis and was in business from 1996 to 2001. @NY, print magazines, and the attending media coverage by the larger New York press helped to popularize both the name, and the idea of New York City as a dot-com center.

In 1997, over 200 members and leaders of Silicon Alley joined NYC entrepreneurs, Andrew Rasiej and Cecilia Pagkalinawan to help wire Washington Irving High School to the Internet. This response and the Department of Education's growing need for technology integration marked the birth of Making Opportunities for Upgrading Schools and Education (MOUSE), an organization that today serves tens of thousands of underserved youth in schools in five states and over 20 countries.

Dot-com bust 

The rapid growth of internet companies during the 1990s, known as the Dot-com bubble, came to a rapid halt during the early 2000s recession. During this economic contraction, many internet companies in Silicon Alley folded. The recession also affected publications that covered the sector. After the dot-com bust, the Silicon Alley Reporter was rebranded as Venture Reporter, in September 2001, and sold to Dow Jones. Self-financed AlleyCat News ceased publication in October 2001.

Recovery 

A couple of years after the dot-com bust, Silicon Alley began making its comeback with the help of NY Tech Meetup, and NextNY. On December 19, 2011, then Mayor Michael R. Bloomberg announced his choice of Cornell University and Technion-Israel Institute of Technology to build a US$2 billion graduate school of applied sciences on Roosevelt Island, with the goal of transforming New York City into the world's premier technology capital.  As of 2013, Google's second largest office by number of employees, 111 Eighth Avenue, is located in New York. Verizon Communications, headquartered at 140 West Street in Lower Manhattan, was in 2014 in the final stages of completing a US$3 billion fiberoptic telecommunications upgrade throughout New York City.

This revival was not restricted to Lower Manhattan, but was spread throughout New York City.  Hence "Silicon Alley" has been considered by some observers to be an obsolete term.

See also 

 BioValley
 Silicon Beach - Westside, Los Angeles
 Silicon Docks - Dublin, Republic of Ireland
 Silicon Forest - Portland, Oregon
 Silicon Hills - Austin, Texas
 Silicon Prairie - Several Midwestern cities
 Silicon Slopes - Lehi, Utah
 Silicon Valley - San Jose, California
 Silicon Wadi - coastal Israel
 Tech Valley - Hudson Valley, New York

References

Further reading

 "How Silicon Alley Growth is Outpacing Silicon Valley," December 10, 2015
 New York Post, "Silicon Alley Soaring," January 24, 2012
 The New York Times, "Alive and Well in Silicon Alley", March 12, 2006
 The New York Times, "New York Isn't Silicon Valley. That’s Why They Like It", March 6, 2010
 SiliconAlley.com, "New York's Tax-Free Zones: An Emerging Technology Company's Dream Come True?," July 26,2013
 Silicon Alley' Is Dead"
 "Silicon Valley vs. Silicon Alley: Can New York compete with the best of the west?" 

Neighborhoods in Manhattan
Economy of New York City
High-technology business districts in the United States
Information technology places
Flatiron District